is a Japanese modern pentathlete who won two team medals at the 2010 and 2014 Asian Games. He finished 22nd at the 2016 Olympics.

Miguchi started as a swimmer and competed for the national junior team. He changed to pentathlon in 2006, and in 2010 received the Japan Sports Award.

References

1986 births
Living people
Modern pentathletes at the 2016 Summer Olympics
Olympic modern pentathletes of Japan
Japanese male modern pentathletes
Asian Games silver medalists for Japan
Asian Games bronze medalists for Japan
Medalists at the 2010 Asian Games
Medalists at the 2014 Asian Games
Asian Games medalists in modern pentathlon
Modern pentathletes at the 2010 Asian Games
Modern pentathletes at the 2014 Asian Games
20th-century Japanese people
21st-century Japanese people